Events from the year 1969 in China.

Incumbents 
 Chairman of the Chinese Communist Party – Mao Zedong
 President of the People's Republic of China – vacant
 Premier of the People's Republic of China – Zhou Enlai
 Chairman of the National People's Congress – Zhu De
 Vice President of the People's Republic of China – Soong Ching-ling and Dong Biwu
 First Vice Premier of the People's Republic of China – Lin Biao

Governors 
 Governor of Anhui Province – Li Desheng
 Governor of Fujian Province – Han Xianchu
 Governor of Gansu Province – Song Ping 
 Governor of Guangdong Province – Huang Yongsheng (until June), Liu Xingyuan (starting June)
 Governor of Guizhou Province – Ma Li 
 Governor of Hebei Province – Li Xuefeng  
 Governor of Heilongjiang Province – Pan Fusheng 
 Governor of Henan Province – Liu Jianxun   
 Governor of Hubei Province – Zeng Siyu
 Governor of Hunan Province – Li Yuan
 Governor of Jiangsu Province – Xu Shiyou 
 Governor of Jiangxi Province – Cheng Shiqing 
 Governor of Jilin Province – Wang Huaixiang 
 Governor of Liaoning Province – Chen Xilian 
 Governor of Qinghai Province – Liu Xianquan 
 Governor of Shaanxi Province – Li Ruishan 
 Governor of Shandong Province – Wang Xiaoyu (until unknown)
 Governor of Shanxi Province – Liu Geping 
 Governor of Sichuan Province – Zhang Guohua 
 Governor of Yunnan Province – Tan Furen 
 Governor of Zhejiang Province – Nan Ping

Events 

 9th National Congress of the Chinese Communist Party
 9th Politburo of the Chinese Communist Party
 1969 Yangjiang earthquake
 1969 Bohai earthquake
 Sino-Soviet border conflict
 Tielieketi
 July 10 to 16 – According to Chinese government official confirmed report, a torrential massive heavy rain and debris flow, maximum nearly 600 to 1,000 millimeters precipitation amount, massive flood in Jianghan Plain, Anhui Province, Yangtze river, total 1,603 persons were human relative fatalities. 
 September (unknown date) – Qingdao Second Radio Electronic, as predecessor for Hisense was founded in Shandong Province.

Births 
 Ai Jing, Chinese singer
 Sheng Zhimin
 Luo Xi (synchronised swimmer, born 1969)
 Tang Xuezhong
 Lü Siqing
 Zhang Bin (pentathlete)
 Li Wenkai

Deaths 

 Liu Shaoqi
 Tao Zhu
 He Long
 Doe Ching
 Chen Shaokuan
 Guo Qiru
 Wu Dingliang
 Xiong Qinglai
 Yin Haiguang
 Xu Guangda
 Liu Luyin

See also 
 1969 in Chinese film

References